Filbyterna were a Swedish motorcycle speedway team based at the Linköping Motorstadion in Linköping], Sweden. They were twice champions of Sweden.

History

1948 to 1958
The team were one of the seven inaugural members of the Swedish speedway league, which started during the 1948 Swedish speedway season. Based in Linköping their official name was Linköping MK but they took the nickname Filbyterna.

They won the first league (known as the Dirt Track League) in 1948 and became the first Swedish Speedway Team Championship winners.

In 1950 they won their second team championship. The home track was at the Ryd Motorstadion.

In 1951, the club signed Ove Fundin and he would stay until 1957. He won the first of his five World Championships as a Filbyterna rider in 1956.

1959 to 2000
In 1959, the club competed in the second division for the first time and in 1961 they did not compete at all. The team then spent the next four decades outside of the top division.

In 1978, the club moved to the Linköping Motorstadion. It was in 1978 that they also won the third tier league.

When the Elitserien was introduced in 1982, the team were finishing last in Division 1 north. From 1982 until their demise in 2000 the team's success was to limited to third division wins in 1983, 1988 and 1999.

Notable riders

References 

Swedish speedway teams
Sport in Norrköping